Waterfront is a 1934 crime drama novel by the British writer John Brophy. It is set in his native Liverpool amongst the world of dockworkers.

Film adaptation
In 1950 it was adapted into a British film of the same title directed by Michael Anderson and starring Robert Newton, Richard Burton and Susan Shaw.

References

Bibliography
 Crowley, Tony. Scouse: A Social and Cultural History. Liverpool University Press,  2012.
 Goble, Alan. The Complete Index to Literary Sources in Film. Walter de Gruyter, 1999.
 Watson, George & Willison, Ian R. The New Cambridge Bibliography of English Literature, Volume 4. CUP, 1972.

1934 British novels
British crime novels
British novels adapted into films
Jonathan Cape books
Novels by John Brophy
Novels set in Liverpool